Peter Burrell may refer to:

Peter Burrell (1692–1756), British MP for Haslemere and Dover
Peter Burrell (1724–1775), his son, British MP for Launceston and Totnes
Peter Burrell, 1st Baron Gwydyr (1754–1820), his son, British MP for Haslemere and Boston, and cricketer
Peter Burrell, 4th Baron Gwydyr (1810–1909), British peer

See also
Peter Drummond-Burrell, 22nd Baron Willoughby de Eresby